Efrem Alekseevich Eshba (– 16 April, 1939) was an Abkhaz and Soviet statesman and leading Bolshevik in Abkhazia in the 1920s.

References
 

1893 births
1939 deaths
People from Tkvarcheli District
People from Sukhum Okrug
Abkhazian politicians
Old Bolsheviks
Great Purge victims from Georgia (country)